Amblygaster sirm, the spotted sardinella, also known as the northern pilchard, spotted pilchard, spotted sardine, and trenched sardine, is a reef-associated marine species of sardinellas in the herring family Clupeidae. It is one of the three species of genus Amblygaster. It is found in the marine waters along Indo-West Pacific regions from Mozambique to the Philippines, and towards north Taiwan and Japan to the far east of Australia and Fiji. It is a widely captured commercial fish in Sri Lanka, where the fish is known as "Hurulla" in Sinhala language.

The fish has 13 to 21 dorsal soft rays and 12 to 23 anal soft rays. It grows up to a maximum length of 27 cm (10.6 in). The distinctive feature of spotted sardinella from other two relatives is the presence of 10 to 20 golden spots along the flank. The color of spots may change into black after preservation. Belly is less rounded and scutes are not prominent. The fish feeds on minute organisms like copepods, larval bivalves and aquatic gastropods, and  dinoflagellates like Peridinium and Ceratium. The fish is used in tuna fishery as a live or dead bait.

See also
 Amblygaster clupeoides 
 Amblygaster leiogaster 
 Commercial fish of Sri Lanka

References

Chemical Composition and Fatty Acid Profile of Small Pelagic Fish (Amblygaster sirm and Sardinella gibbosa) from Muara Angke, Indonesia
Population dynamics of trenched sardine Amblygaster sirm (Clupeidae) in the Western Coastal waters of Sri Lanka
Studies on the exploitation of trenched sardine Amblygaster sirm (WALBAUM) off the Negombo Coast
Biology and phenology of Amblygaster sirm

Clupeidae
Marine fauna of East Africa
Fish of Taiwan
Fish of the Philippines
Fish of Sri Lanka
Marine fish of Northern Australia
Taxa named by Johann Julius Walbaum
spotted sardinella